Inroak / Chinlak is a village in the Nicobar district of Andaman and Nicobar Islands, India. Among the least populated villages in India, it is located in the Nancowry tehsil. It comes under the administration of Nancowry Tribal Council.

Demographics 

According to the 2011 census of India, Inroak / Chinlak has only 1 household with 1 person. The only resident is literate, which makes the village's literacy rate 100%.

References 

Villages in Nancowry tehsil